State Route 45 (SR 45) is a west–east route in Davidson County, Tennessee.  It connects US 431 (Whites Creek Pike) in Whites Creek with I-40 in Hermitage.

Route description 
SR 45 makes up much of the northern half of Nashville's Old Hickory Boulevard loop. It continues the loop from the intersection with Whites Creek Pike (US 431) in Whites Creek. Traveling parallel to Little Creek, it enters Nashville proper and continues past I-24 exit 40 to its intersection with US 31W/US 41 (Dickerson Pike). After that intersection, the road becomes a four-lane divided highway. SR 45 goes south of Cedar Hill Park and past I-65 exit 92 to enter Madison, where it has an intersection with US 31E (Gallatin Pike). After it crosses the Cumberland River, SR 45 continues onto Robinson Road through the town of Old Hickory before rejoining Old Hickory Boulevard. It heads south through Lakewood and by The Hermitage, to the eponymous town of Hermitage, where it has intersections with US 70 (Lebanon Pike) and SR 265 (Central Pike). SR 45 ends at I-40 exit 221, and Old Hickory Boulevard continues south to Bell Road.

Major intersections

References 

045
045
045